La colpa di una madre is a 1952 Italian melodrama film.

Plot

Cast
 Marina Berti as Alma 
 Folco Lulli as Enrico 
 Mirella Uberti as Mara 
 Marcella Rovena as Agata 
 Ave Ninchi as Rosa 
 Otello Toso as Mr. Herbert 
 Erno Crisa as Alberto 
 Lauro Gazzolo as The Fisherman
 Carlo Tusco as Enzo

External links
 

1952 films
1950s Italian-language films
Italian drama films
1952 drama films
Italian black-and-white films
Melodrama films
1950s Italian films